A BTAN or Bon à Taux Annuel Normalisé (Pl.: Bons à Taux Annuel Normalisés) was a coupon-bearing French government bond with a two to five year maturity. The last of these matured on 25 July 2017.

References

External links
BTAN sur le site de l'Agence France Trésor, qui gère la dette de l'État

Government bonds issued by France